Bakit Lahat ng Gwapo may Boyfriend? is a 2016 Philippine comedy-drama film directed by Jun Robles Lana, starring Anne Curtis, Dennis Trillo, Paolo Ballesteros. It was released on October 19, 2016, by Viva Films.

Plot
Kylie, a wedding planner, has had a string of boyfriends. Unfortunately for her, all of them have turned out to be gay including Benj, her first boyfriend. On the upside, some of them have become good friends. In fact, Benj became one of her best friends, on top of being a business partner in a wedding planning venture. Because of her "luck" with men, she comes to believe that she will never find a real guy. Everyone she will get attracted to will eventually come out as gay. This theory gets put to the test when she meets Diego, Benj's childhood best friend and secret love, with whom she gets easily smitten. Egged on by Benj, Kylie sets out to prove that she's right again about Diego, who is engaged to be married to a beautiful and classy lady, is indeed another closet case.

Cast and characters 

 Anne Curtis as Kylie
 Dennis Trillo as Diego
 Paolo Ballesteros as Benj

Supporting cast
Will Devaughn as Henry
Yam Concepcion as Fiona
Sinon Loresca as Ramon Ramon
Prince Stefan as Tom
Yayo Aguila as Dina
Donnalyn Bartolome as Cindy
Michael De Mesa as Nap/Lexi
Alma Concepcion as Julia

References

2016 films
Philippine comedy-drama films
2016 comedy-drama films
Viva Films films
Films directed by Jun Robles Lana